The 2014 Orienteering World Cup was the 20th edition of the Orienteering World Cup. The 2014 Orienteering World Cup consisted of 14 events, all individual competitions. The events were located in Turkey, Spain, Portugal, Norway, Finland, Italy and Switzerland. The 2014 European Orienteering Championships in Palmela, Portugal and the 2014 World Orienteering Championships in Venezia and Trentino, Italy were included in the World Cup.

In the women's World Cup, Daniel Hubmann of Switzerland won his fifth title in total. Tove Alexandersson of Sweden won her first overall title in the women's World Cup.

Events

Men

Women

Points distribution
The 40 best runners in each event were awarded points. In the final race (WC 14), the runners were awarded a double number of points.

Overall standings
This section shows the final standings after all 14 individual events.

Achievements
Only individual competitions.

External links
 World Cup Ranking - IOF

References

Orienteering World Cup seasons
Orienteering competitions